Notarius cookei is a species of catfish in the family Ariidae. It was described by Arturo Acero Pizarro and Ricardo Betancur-Rodríguez in 2002, originally under the genus Arius.

The IUCN redlist currently lists the species as Vulnerable, citing residential and commercial developments, water pollution and logging practices as its main threats.

References

Ariidae
Fish described in 2002